The 1992 Pacific Cup was the second annual under-18 ice hockey tournament, now known as the Ivan Hlinka Memorial Tournament, held in Tokyo, Japan from August 1–4, 1992.  Canada captured their first gold medal after having finished as runners-up to the Soviet Union the previous year.  They went undefeated in all three games of the tournament and defeated Russia 5–3 in the final and deciding game.  Russia finished with the silver, Japan earned the bronze, while the United States, winless during the tournament, rounded out the four teams.

Results

Final standings

See also
1992 World Junior Championships

External links
 Hockey Archives 1992 

1992
1992–93 in Canadian ice hockey
1992–93 in American ice hockey
1992–93 in Russian ice hockey
1992–93 in Asian ice hockey
1992